Purna Mohan Tripura was  Tipra Indian politician from Tripura.He was a prominent leader of Communist Party of India Marxist. He became  Member of the Legislative Assembly in 1972. He won 1972,1977,1983 Tripura Legislative Assembly election from Chawamanu
He became Minister for Finance and Power in Nripen Chakraborty Time.

References

Members of the Tripura Legislative Assembly
Indian politicians